Grave Times is the debut album by English metal band The Defiled. It was released on 14 February 2011 through Raise the Game and with Metal Hammer magazine as a free cover mount disc along with the January issue. So far music videos have been released for 3 tracks: Call To Arms, Black Death and Blood Sells. Black Death and Blood Sells were both released as singles with remixes and alternative versions on 18 December 2012. It is also JC Brutal's last release with the band, and Vincent Hyde's first.

Track List

Personnel

The Defiled
Stitch D - vocals, guitar
The AvD - programming, synthesizer, keyboards, backing vocals
Aaron Curse - guitar
Vincent Hyde - bass guitar
JC Brutal - drums

Production
Dan Weller - mixing

References

2011 debut albums
The Defiled albums